Roxanne Beckford-Hoge (born November 17, 1969) is a Jamaican-born American actress.

Career 
She has acted in numerous television series and played minor roles in films, including Bewitched (2005) Something's Gotta Give (2003), and Father of the Bride Part II (1995). Beckford began her career in acting as a child in Jamaica in a radio play and starred in a television commercial for Fab laundry detergent. Her husband, Bob Hoge, is also an actor. They have four children, including twins who were featured on episode one of TLC's Bringing Home Baby in 2005.

Personal life
 
Beckford married actor/writer/director Bob Hoge in 1996. Her husband also runs a maternity business. When she appeared on the TLC Channel reality series Bringing Home Baby with her husband in 2005, Beckford had just given birth to their twins.

Filmography

Film/Movie

Television

Video games

References

External links

 RightOnAmerica.org

American film actresses
American television actresses
Jamaican emigrants to the United States
1969 births
Living people
African-American actresses
People from Kingston, Jamaica
20th-century American actresses
21st-century American actresses
20th-century African-American women
20th-century African-American people
21st-century African-American women
21st-century African-American people